Luchtkastelen  is a 1914 Dutch silent drama film directed by Louis H. Chrispijn.

Cast
Willem van der Veer	... 	Jack
Annie Bos	... 	Alice Stanton
Jan van Dommelen	... 	Visser / Fisherman
Theo Frenkel		
Eugenie Krix	... 	Mevrouw Stanton / Mrs. Stanton
Koba Kinsbergen		
Alex Benno		
Fred Homann	... 	Visser / Fisherman

External links 
 

1914 films
Dutch silent feature films
Dutch black-and-white films
1914 drama films
Films directed by Louis H. Chrispijn
Dutch drama films
Silent drama films